A myxoma (New Latin from Greek 'muxa' for mucus) is a myxoid tumor of primitive connective tissue. It is most commonly found in the heart (and is the most common primary tumor of the heart in adults) but can also occur in other locations.

Types
Table below:

1.SMA, smooth muscle actin. 2.MSA, muscle-specific actin. 3.EMA, epithelial membrane antigen.

Symptoms and signs
Symptoms associated with cardiac myxomas are typically due to the effect of the mass of the tumor obstructing the normal flow of blood within the chambers of the heart. Because pedunculated myxomas are somewhat mobile, symptoms may only occur when the patient is in a particular position.

Some symptoms of myxoma may be associated with the release of interleukin 6 (IL-6) by the myxoma.  High levels of IL-6 may be associated with a higher risk of embolism of the myxoma.

Symptoms of a cardiac myxoma include:
 Dyspnea on exertion
 Paroxysmal nocturnal dyspnea
 Fever
 Weight loss (see cachexia)
 Lightheadedness or syncope (Loss of consciousness)
 Hemoptysis
 Sudden death
 Tachycardia or milder heartrate, i.e. 75 - 100 cycl/min

Location

Ocular myxoma 
Myxoma is a rare, benign stromal tumor of mesenchymal origin often confused with other conjunctival stromal tumors. Conjunctival myxomas are thought to originate in Tenon's capsule and can masquerade as conjunctival lymphoma, lymphangioma, ocular surface squamous neoplasia (OSSN), or amelanotic melanoma.
 Atrial myxoma
 Cutaneous myxoma
 Odontogenic myxoma

Atrial myxoma 
Myxomas are usually located in either the left or right atrium of the heart; about 86 percent occur in the left atrium.

Myxomas are typically pedunculated, with a stalk that is attached to the interatrial septum. The most common location for attachment of the stalk is the fossa ovalis region of the interatrial septum.

An atrial myxoma may create an extra heart sound, audible to auscultation just after S2. It is most seen on echocardiography, as a pedunculated mass that is heterogeneous in appearance. A left atrial myxoma will cause an increase in pulmonary capillary wedge pressure.

The differential diagnosis include other cardiac tumors such as lipomas and rhabdomyomas (and rarely teratomas).  These other tumors of the heart are typically not pedunculated, however, and are more likely to infiltrate the muscle of the heart. Cardiac magnetic resonance imaging (MRI) can help non-invasively diagnose cardiac tumors.  However, diagnosis usually requires examination of a tissue sample by a pathologist.

Treatment 
Myxomas are usually removed surgically.  The surgeon removes the myxoma, along with at least 5 surrounding millimeters of atrial septum.  The septum is then repaired, using material from the pericardium.

Epidemiology 
Cardiac myxomas predominantly appear in females in their 30s to 40s. Myxomas are the most common primary cardiac tumor affecting adults, accounting for one quarter to half of primary cardiac tumors seen in clinical practice.

See also 
 Myxoid tumor
 Cutaneous myxoma
 Carney complex
 Myxomatosis
 Primary tumors of the heart
 Myxomatous degeneration

References

External links 

Myxomatous degeneration at Wikidoc

Heart neoplasia
Connective/soft tissue tumors and sarcomas